Pamela Martin may refer to:

 Pamela Martin (television reporter) (born 1953), American-born television reporter on Canadian TV
 Pamela Martin (film editor), American film editor
 Pamela Sue Martin (born 1953), American actress
 Pamela Martin (lawyer), South Australian lawyer

See also
 Deborah Jeane Palfrey (1956–2008), operated Pamela Martin and Associates, an escort agency in Washington, D.C